George Kirby Gay (August 15, 1810 – October 7, 1882) was an English sailor and later settler in the Oregon Country. He was a member of the Willamette Cattle Company that brought livestock to Oregon and built the first brick house in the United States west of the Rocky Mountains. Gay also participated in the Champoeg Meetings that created a provisional government in what would become the U.S. state of Oregon.

Early years
George Gay was born in Gloucestershire, England, on August 15, 1810. He became an apprentice sailor at the age of eleven and traveled much of the world and came to the United States. As a sailor, his last trip was aboard the whaleship Kitty, which he left at Monterey, California, in 1833 where he joined up with fur trapper Ewing Young. Gay went with Young to trap fur bearing animals to the north.

Oregon

In 1835, George Gay returned to the Oregon Country with a party led by John Turner and included William J. Bailey. Two years later he joined Young again and invested in the Willamette Cattle Company. Gay and the others traveled to California by boat to purchase cattle and then overland back to the Willamette Valley. During the trip back, on September 14 they crossed the Shasta River and soon after William J. Bailey and Gay shot a "friendly" native boy in what was considered revenge for attacks on previous trips through the area. The group finished the journey in October 1837 with around 630 head of cattle. Gay became wealthy due to his investment in the enterprise.

Gay then claimed some land along the Willamette River near Wheatland, Oregon, and started farming. In 1841, he began building a home at the site, and when completed in 1842 it was the first brick house in the region. In 1843, he was selected to serve on a committee at the First Wolf Meeting, part of the series of Champoeg Meetings held to discuss forming a government in the Oregon Country.

On May 2, 1843, Gay voted with the prevailing party at the last of the Champoeg Meetings. The 52-50 vote established the Provisional Government of Oregon that would last until the Oregon Territory's government superseded it in 1849. Gay’s home would serve as one of the markers of the boundaries within the government. The south wall of his house marked the boundary line between the Yamhill and Champooick districts, and though the house is no longer standing, the location of that wall currently marks the line between Yamhill and Polk counties. In 1848, he went south to the California Gold Rush and mined for a time before returning to Oregon.

Later years

Upon returning to Oregon, Gay was considered one of the wealthiest people in what had become the Oregon Territory. He was married on four occasions and fathered nine children. The children, Mary Ann, Joseph Witcum, John Kirby, Alfred, Paul George, William Edouard, Adaline Bellay, Louisa and Henri St. Clair were all the children of first wife, Louisa Gay. He married Louisa Hare, Mary Manson, Mary Condon and Mary Ann Rubidow. Rubidow was born Marie Anne Toupin in 1826, and married Gay on February 11, 1867. George Kirby Gay lost his fortune and died poor on October 7, 1882, at the age of 72 and was buried on his property near Wheatland, Oregon. A granite and bronze marker placed by the Daughters of the American Revolution on the Yamhill-Polk County line on Oregon Route 221 commemorates the location of Gay's home and gravesite and his involvement in the Champoeg Meetings.

See also
Johnnie Ray

References

External links
Picture of Gay
Oregon Historic Photograph Collections: Gay house

1810 births
1882 deaths
American fur traders
Champoeg Meetings
Oregon pioneers
People from Yamhill County, Oregon
English emigrants to the United States